Roland Frank Sheldon (born December 17, 1936) is a retired American professional baseball player, a right-handed pitcher who appeared in 160 Major League games from  to  and  to . Born in Putnam, Connecticut, he attended the University of Connecticut.

Early career with Yankees
Signed by the New York Yankees at age 23 after one season as a baseball and basketball player at UConn preceded by a semester at Texas A&M and four years of service in the United States Air Force, in his first pro campaign, 1960, pitching in the Class D New York–Pennsylvania League, Sheldon won 15 games and lost one (for a winning percentage of .938) with 15 complete games. 

The following year, he made the 1961 Yankees' varsity roster out of spring training, survived the May cutdown from 28 to 25 men, and took a turn in the Bombers' starting rotation in July and August. On July 5 and 9, he tossed consecutive complete-game shutouts against the Cleveland Indians and Boston Red Sox, as the Yankees kept pace with the Detroit Tigers in a two-team pennant race—ultimately won by the Yankees in September. Sheldon would pitch in 35 games, including 21 starts, and win 11 of 16 decisions Sheldon, however, did not appear in the 1961 World Series, won by the Yankees in five games over the Cincinnati Reds.

The 1962 season saw Sheldon make 34 total appearances (with 16 starts) and posted a 7–8 record and a 5.49 earned run average. The Yankees won the American League pennant, but again Sheldon was not used in the World Series, a seven-game triumph over the San Francisco Giants.

Later MLB career
Recalled by the Yankees in June 1964, Sheldon contributed to their successful pennant defense during a summer-long struggle against the Chicago White Sox and Baltimore Orioles. He appeared in 19 games, with 12 starts, threw three complete game victories and added a save coming out of the bullpen. He then appeared in Games 1 and 7 of the 1964 World Series against the St. Louis Cardinals, hurling  innings pitched of hitless, scoreless relief. The Yankees, however, lost both games and the series to the Redbirds.

He began  with three appearances as a relief pitcher out of the Yankee bullpen, but on May 3 he was traded to the cellar-dwelling Kansas City Athletics with Johnny Blanchard for Doc Edwards, a journeyman catcher. Sheldon managed a winning record, 10–8, with a 3.95 earned run average for a Kansas City team that lost 103 games. Then, in 1966, he posted a solid 3.13 ERA in 14 games for the Athletics, even though he lost seven of 11 decisions, through mid-June.  Two days before the June 15 trade deadline, he was acquired by the Red Sox, another second-division club, in a six-player trade and plugged into Boston's starting rotation, where he was ineffective. He ended up only 1–6 (4.97) in 23 games for the Red Sox, was traded during the offseason to Cincinnati, and never returned to the majors. He pitched four full seasons of Triple-A ball before retiring after the 1970 campaign.

For his career, Sheldon appeared in 160 Major League games and notched 371 strikeouts in  innings pitched. He allowed 741 hits and 207 bases on balls. He had 17 complete games, four shutouts and two saves. During his off-seasons, Sheldon completed his coursework for a degree in physical education in 1965 from the University of Connecticut.

References

External links
 Baseball Reference

1936 births
Living people
Auburn Yankees players
Baseball players from Connecticut
Boston Red Sox players
Buffalo Bisons (minor league) players
UConn Huskies baseball players
UConn Huskies men's basketball players
Indianapolis Indians players
Kansas City Athletics players
Major League Baseball pitchers
New York Yankees players
People from Putnam, Connecticut
Richmond Virginians (minor league) players
Salt Lake City Bees players
Seattle Angels players
Sportspeople from Windham County, Connecticut
Toledo Mud Hens players
Tucson Toros players
Vancouver Mounties players
American men's basketball players